François Rousseau is a  medical doctor and researcher from Quebec Canada. His publications include studies about Quebec health history. His book L'oeuvre de chère en Nouvelle-France: Le régime des malades à l'Hôtel-Dieu de Québec was a finalist for the 1983 Governor General's Awards in "French Language - Non-fiction" category. In 1994, he published ''La croix et le scalpel: Histoire des Augustines et de l'Hôtel-Dieu de Québec (1639-1989).

References

Canadian medical writers
Physicians from Quebec
20th-century Canadian physicians 
Canadian writers in French
Living people
Canadian medical researchers
Writers from Quebec
Place of birth missing (living people)
Year of birth missing (living people)